Melbourne City Wrestling is an Australian independent professional wrestling promotion founded in 2010, in Melbourne, Victoria, Australia.

Melbourne City Wrestling currently has two major venues that they use. MCW hosts monthly events at the Essendon Ukrainian Hall which is fondly dubbed the "MCW Arena" by their loyal following of fans. MCW also hold their super card events, which are only held a few months of the year, within the grand ballroom at the Thornbury Theatre, dubbed "the birthplace of MCW" as the first ever MCW event was held here.

History

Partnerships & affiliations

Promotion partnerships 
In April 2018, Progress Wrestling co-promoted a show with Australian independent professional wrestling promotions Explosive Pro Wrestling, Melbourne City Wrestling and Pro Wrestling Australia. In June 2019, Melbourne City Wrestling held the cross-promotional event, Southern Rumble 2019, in partnership with Southern Pro Wrestling (SPW) in Invercargill, New Zealand

Training affiliation 
During Progress x Melbourne City Wrestling show on 20 April 2018, Melbourne City Wrestling announced the launch of their own training academy.

Championships and accomplishments

Current championships

Other accomplishments 

 The list of Melbourne City Wrestling (MCW) Triple Crown winners can be found here.

MCW World Heavyweight Championship

Reigns

Combined reigns

MCW Intercommonwealth Championship

Names

Inaugural MCW Intercommonwealth Championship Tournament

Reigns

Combined reigns

MCW Tag Team Championship

Names

Inaugural MCW Tag Team Championship Tournament

Reigns

Combined reigns

By team

By individual

MCW Women's Championship

Names

Inaugural MCW Women's Championship Tournament

Reigns

Combined Reigns

Roster 
MCW wrestlers are freelance competitors, meaning they appear for multiple promotions either nationwide or worldwide as well as performing for Melbourne City Wrestling. The current roster are wrestlers who have appeared on the three most recent MCW shows, barring any who have announced they have left the promotion, while the list of alumni and notable guests is of wrestlers who have competed at MCW events in the past. (Correct as of January 13th, 2018 - MCW Vendetta)
 Adam Brooks
 Anth Cava
 Caveman Ugg
 Edward Dusk
 Emman The Kid
 Gore
 Jake Andrewartha
 Jessica Troy
 Mitch Waterman
 Mikey Broderick
 Nick Bury
 Robbie Eagles
 Rocky Menero
 Royce Chambers
 Slex
 Skylar Cruize
 Stevie Filip
 Tome Filip
 Tony Villani
 Tyson Baxter

 Broadcast team 

 Lindsay Howarth(Commentator)
 Lord Andy Coyne(Commentator & Ring Announcer)
 Sebastian Walker(Commentator)

Media

DVD releases 
Select events are made available for purchase on DVD from Melbourne City Wrestling Online Shop.

Video on demand 
In early 2014, Melbourne City Wrestling launched "MCW Encore: Video On Demand" on Vimeo, which includes MCW events held between 2010 and 2017, as well as some documentaries. The majority of the back catalogue of events are available for a monthly subscription fee, or events can be purchased individually.

On 25 January 2018, Melbourne City Wrestling launched "MCW Encore: Video On Demand" on Pivotshare.

See also

 Professional wrestling in Australia
 List of professional wrestling organisations in Australia

Notes

References

External links 

 
 Cagematch profile
 MCW Academy

Australian professional wrestling promotions
Sport in Melbourne
Entertainment companies established in 2010
Companies based in Melbourne
2010 establishments in Australia